The Prosopographisches Lexikon der Palaiologenzeit (German: "Prosopographical Lexicon of the Palaiologan era"), abbreviated PLP, is a German-language reference work on the people of the last two centuries of the Byzantine Empire, from 1261 until the Fall of Constantinople in 1453, when the Empire was governed by the Palaiologos dynasty.

It consists of 15 volumes: 12 main volumes, 2 appendix and errata volumes and 1 index volume. In 2001, the PLP was launched online as a subscription-based service and a CD.

The work is a comprehensive source on the biographies and genealogy not only of Byzantine Greeks, but also Bulgarians, Serbs, Albanians, Turks and other peoples who interacted with the Byzantine Empire at the time.

External links 
 Print version
 Online version

Byzantine studies
Prosopography of the Byzantine Empire
German dictionaries
Books about the Byzantine Empire